The Australian national water polo team represents Australia in men's international water polo competitions and is controlled by Water Polo Australia. The national men's team has the nickname of "The Sharks". It is organised into the Asia/Oceania regional group.

History
Australia has competed internationally since the 1948 London Olympic Games, and has qualified for all subsequent Olympic tournaments except Atlanta in 1996, and although not achieving the success of European teams, has remained relatively competitive at international level since.

In 1968, the team qualified to compete at the Mexico Olympic Games, but was denied entry by the Australian Olympic Federation.

Australia scored their first point in Olympic competition when they drew with Bulgaria in the 1972 Summer Olympics in Munich.

The Australian team placed 5th in the 1984 Summer Olympics in Los Angeles, and in the 1992 Summer Olympics in Barcelona, the highest Olympic placing so far, and finished 4th in the World Championships at home in Perth in 1998.

Australia's best international water polo success came in 1996, when the Sharks won the six-nation Control Cup in Hungary, and followed it up with a bronze medal at an eight nation tournament in Italy in the same year. However, they failed to qualify for that year's Olympics for the first time since 1948.

A reinvigorated youthful team managed to finish second to Canada in an international tournament in England in 2002, and in 2003, they beat then world champions Serbia 12–11 in a FINA Water Polo World League match in Hungary, and followed it up by beating Croatia 10–6 at the 2003 Water polo world championship in Barcelona, Spain.

Australia finished 2nd at the 2018 World Cup in Berlin, Germany.

At the 2020 Summer Olympics, Australia surprisingly beat former champion Croatia. Yet, the Australians were not to able progress through to the quarter finals, but still managed to clinch two wins out of their five games.

Tournament history
A red box around the year indicates tournaments played within Australia

Olympic Games

World Championship

1973 – 14th place
1975 – 11th place
1978 – 9th place
1982 – 11th place
1986 – 10th place
1991 – 8th place
1994 – 10th place
1998 – 4th place
2001 – 10th place
2003 – 7th place
2005 – 10th place
2007 – 10th place
2009 – 10th place
2011 – 9th place
2013 – 8th place
2015 – 8th place
2017 – 7th place
2019 – 6th place
2022 – 11th place

World Cup

 1981 – 7th place
 1985 – 7th place
 1989 – 7th place
 1991 – 7th place
 1993 –  Bronze medal
 1999 – 8th place
 2010 – 6th place
 2014 – 5th place
 2018 –  Silver medal

World League

 2003 – 7th place
 2004 – 7th place
 2005 – 11th place
 2006 – 4th place
 2007 –  Bronze medal
 2008 –  Bronze medal
 2009 – 6th place
 2010 – 4th place
 2011 – 6th place
 2012 – 7th place
 2014 – 4th place
 2015 – 5th place
 2016 – 5th place
 2017 – 7th place
 2018 – 6th place
 2019 –  Bronze medal
 2022 – 7th place

Commonwealth Championship

 2002 –  Silver medal
 2006 –  Gold medal

Team

Current squad
Roster for the 2020 Summer Olympics.

Notable players
 Pietro Figlioli
 Thomas Whalan
 Nathan Thomas

See also
 Australia men's Olympic water polo team records and statistics
 Australia women's national water polo team

References

External links
Official website

 
Men's national water polo teams